Raoul Bricard (23 March 1870 – 26 November 1943) was a French engineer and a mathematician.  He is best known for his work in geometry, especially descriptive geometry and scissors congruence, and kinematics, especially mechanical linkages.

Biography 
Bricard taught geometry at Ecole Centrale des Arts et Manufactures.  In 1908 he became a professor of applied geometry at the National Conservatory of Arts and Crafts in Paris. In 1932 he received the Poncelet Prize in mathematics from the Paris Academy of Sciences for his work in geometry.

Work 
In 1896 Bricard published a paper on Hilbert's third problem, even before the problem was stated by Hilbert.  In it he proved that mirror symmetric polytopes are scissors congruent, and proved a weak version of Dehn's criterion.

In 1897 Bricard published an important investigation on flexible polyhedra. In it he classified all flexible octahedra, now known as Bricard octahedra. This work was the subject of Henri Lebesgue's lectures in 1938. Later Bricard discovered notable 6-bar linkages.

Bricard also gave one of the first geometric proofs of Morley's trisector theorem in 1922.

Books 
Bricard authored six books, including a mathematics survey in Esperanto. He is listed in Encyclopedia of Esperanto.
 Matematika terminaro kaj krestomatio (in Esperanto), Hachette, Paris, 1905
 Géométrie descriptive, O. Doin et fils, 1911
 Cinématique et mécanismes, A. Colin, 1921
 Petit traité de perspective, Vuibert, 1924
 Leçons de cinématique, Gauthier-Villars et cie., 1926
Le calcul vectoriel, A. Colin, 1929

Notes

References 
 Laurent R., Raoul Bricard, Professeur de Géométrie appliquée aux arts, in Fontanon C., Grelon A. (éds.), Les professeurs du Conservatoire national des arts et métiers, dictionnaire biographique, 1794-1955, INRP-CNAM, Paris 1994, vol. 1, pp. 286–291.

External links
 

19th-century French mathematicians
20th-century French mathematicians
20th-century French engineers
Geometers
1870 births
1943 deaths